"Magic" is a song by American rock band the Cars from their fifth studio album, Heartbeat City (1984). It was released on May 7, 1984, as the album's second single, reaching number 12 on the US Billboard Hot 100 and number one on the Billboard Top Tracks chart. The track was written by Ric Ocasek and produced by Robert John "Mutt" Lange and the Cars. Ocasek sang lead vocals.

Music video
The music video for "Magic" is set at a pool party attended by an array of bizarre and comically deranged characters. It features Ocasek walking on the water of the swimming pool as the various characters gather to marvel at him. Toward the end of the video, some of the guests (perhaps in their own delusion) attempt to reach Ocasek by stepping onto the pool's surface believing that they too can walk on water, but only end up plunging into the pool. Ocasek remains standing (and dry) because, as the song title suggests, "it's magic".

The Cars shot "Magic" at the Hilton family house in Beverly Hills, which Kathy Hilton had leased to the band. A plexiglass platform sat under the surface of the water. On the first take, the platform collapsed. The platform had to be adjusted to Ocasek's weight.

Charts

Weekly charts

Year-end charts

References

1984 singles
1984 songs
The Cars songs
Elektra Records singles
Music videos directed by Tim Pope
Song recordings produced by Ric Ocasek
Song recordings produced by Robert John "Mutt" Lange
Songs written by Ric Ocasek